Bevan John Docherty  (born 29 March 1977) is a triathlete from New Zealand, who won medals twice at the Olympic Games. Docherty attended Tauhara College, Taupo.

Life
Docherty and his sister Fiona grew up in Taupo, in the North Island of New Zealand and attended Tauhara College. Their father Ray was a keen triathlete and their mother, Irene, her sister and Bevan trained and competed with him.

In 2004, Docherty won the ITU world championship, and the silver medal at the 2004 Summer Olympics in Athens, behind fellow New Zealander Hamish Carter. He added another silver medal at the 2006 Commonwealth Games, and claimed the bronze at the 2008 Summer Olympics in Beijing. The former world champion has started a new initiative, called "The Docherty Dares programme", aimed at supporting Kiwis to achieve goals they previously never thought possible.

The programme was inspired when Docherty saw Christchurch local, Scott Kotoul, crossing the finish line at the Round Lake Taupo Cycle Challenge. Near exhaustion after only doing half the distance (80 km), Kotoul said he was only going to target the distance of 40 km by the following year. However, Docherty dared Kotoul to enter the entire 160 km bike, so the latter accepted the challenge.

References

External links
 
 
 
 
 
 Official website
 (video) Final sprint at the 2005 New Plymouth ITU World Cup triathlon.

1977 births
Living people
Olympic silver medalists for New Zealand
Olympic bronze medalists for New Zealand
Triathletes at the 2004 Summer Olympics
Triathletes at the 2008 Summer Olympics
Olympic triathletes of New Zealand
Commonwealth Games silver medallists for New Zealand
Sportspeople from Taupō
Olympic medalists in triathlon
Triathletes at the 2012 Summer Olympics
Triathletes at the 2006 Commonwealth Games
Medalists at the 2008 Summer Olympics
Medalists at the 2004 Summer Olympics
Members of the New Zealand Order of Merit
New Zealand male triathletes
Commonwealth Games medallists in triathlon
People educated at Tauhara College
Medallists at the 2006 Commonwealth Games